Sprague House may refer to:

in the United States (by state then city)
Lillard-Sprague House, Rogers, Arkansas, listed on the National Register of Historic Places (NRHP) in Benton County
Elias Sprague House, Coventry, Connecticut, listed on the NRHP in Tolland County
Sprague Street Houses, Shreveport, Louisiana, listed on the NRHP in Caddo Parish
Sprague House (Danvers, Massachusetts), listed on the NRHP in Essex County
Thomas S. Sprague House, Detroit, Michigan, listed on the NRHP in Detroit
Rollin Sprague Building-Old Stone Store, Rochester, Michigan, listed on the NRHP in Oakland County
David R. and Ellsworth A. Sprague Houses, Caledonia, Minnesota, listed on the NRHP in Houston County
Sprague House, Ithaca, New York
Sprague-Deaver House, Fredericktown, Ohio, listed on the NRHP in Knox County
Jonathan Sprague House, Lowell, Ohio, listed on the NRHP in Washington County
Sprague House (Wellington, Ohio), listed on the National Register of Historic Places in Lorain County
Sprague-Marshall-Bowie House, Portland, Oregon, listed on the NRHP in Northwest Portland
Gov. William Sprague Mansion, Cranston, Rhode Island, listed on the NRHP in Providence County
David Sprague House, Providence, Rhode Island, listed on the NRHP in Providence County